The Estadio Verapaz is a soccer stadium in the city of Cobán in Guatemala. Its official name is Estadio Verapaz Jose Angel Rossi .

It was built in 1936 and its capacity is 15,000. It is home to Liga Nacional club Coban Imperial.

Verapaz